Guillaume Lépine (born January 19, 1985 in Calais) is a French professional football player. As of 2012, he plays in the Championnat de France amateur for AS Marck.

He played on the professional level in Belgian First Division for R.E. Mouscron.

References

1985 births
Living people
French footballers
French expatriate footballers
Expatriate footballers in Belgium
Royal Excel Mouscron players
Association football defenders
French expatriates in Belgium